Barking Abbey is a former royal monastery located in Barking, in the London Borough of Barking and Dagenham. It has been described as having been "one of the most important nunneries in the country".

Originally established in the 7th century, from the late 10th century the abbey followed the Rule of St. Benedict. Despite this, at the time of the dissolution it was still the third wealthiest nunnery in England.

The abbey existed for almost 900 years, until its closure in 1539, as part of King Henry VIII's Dissolution of the Monasteries. It had many notable abbesses including several saints, former queens and the daughters of kings. The abbess of Barking held precedence over all other abbesses in England.

The ruined remains of Barking Abbey now form part of a public open space known as Abbey Green. It is recognisable for its partially restored Grade-II* Listed Curfew Tower, which features on the coat of arms of the London Borough of Barking and Dagenham.

Barking Abbey is also notable because the adjacent St Margaret's Church, a grade I listed building dating back to the 13th century, was built within its grounds. The Abbey Ruins are used as a venue each May for outdoor classical concerts, as well as an annual pilgrimage by members of the Eastern Orthodox Church.

History

Early history
Barking Abbey was one of two monasteries  built in the 7th century by Saint Erkenwald (later Bishop of London). Erkenwald founded Chertsey Abbey for himself, and Barking Abbey for his sister Saint Ethelburga. Erkenwald and Ethelburga were of royal ancestry and were born in the Anglo-Saxon Kingdom of Lindsey (roughly located within the modern county of Lincolnshire).

It is said Ethelburga (a Christian) chose to become a nun to avoid having to marry King Edwin of Northumbria, who was a pagan. However, this seems doubtful, and there may have been confusion between Ethelburga and Æthelburh (Ethelburga) of Kent, who did marry King Edwin in 625.

Either way, Ethelburga's brother Erkenwald founded Barking Abbey specifically for her.  The abbey was endowed by "the East Saxon Princes", who came from the Anglo-Saxon Kingdom of the East Saxons/Kingdom of Essex, and initially dedicated to Saint Mary. However, Ethelburga served as the Abbey's first abbess, and it was later dedicated to both Saint Mary and Saint Ethelburga.  Saint Hildelitha, a nun brought from abroad to teach Ethelburga, would become abbess after her death. Erkenwald himself would die at the abbey in 693, although his body was taken to Chertsey Abbey for burial.

Saint Wulfhilda (Wlfhildis) became abbess of Barking Abbey during the 10th century. Wulfhilda had grown up at Wilton Abbey, Wiltshire. King Edgar the Peaceful fell in love with Wulfhilda at Wilton, but she was committed to pursuing a religious life and spurned his advances, presents and offers of marriage. Eventually Edgar tried to entrap Wulfhilda; getting her aunt, Abbess Wenflaeda of Wherwell to fake an illness and summon Wulfhilda, with Edgar instead waiting when Wulfhilda arrived. On arriving, she "found his fervour so alarming that she fled, leaving her sleeve in his hand, and escaping through the drains".

Wulfhilda pursued her ambition and became a nun. King Edgar then created her Abbess of Barking and donated "considerable estates" to Barking Abbey. Wulfhilda herself donated 20 villages to the abbey and established another monastery at Horton in Kent.

King Edgar's eventual queen, Ælfthryth became jealous of Wulfhilda, and following her husband's death deposed her as Abbess of Barking. Wulfhilda was later restored by Edgar's and Ælfthryth's son, King Æthelred the Unready.

Another version of the story says that Queen Ælfthryth, as overseer of the abbey, deposed the abbess Wulfida after complaints made by the nuns; and that it was the Queen, not her son, who reinstated her twenty years later.

Saint Dunstan, Archbishop of Canterbury, (909 – 19 May 988) changed Barking Abbey to follow the Rule of St. Benedict. According to medieval scholar Katie Ann-Marie Bugyis, Barking Abbey may have been "especially devoted to Martha", the sister of Mary of Bethany and Lazarus in the Gospels of Luke and John.

After the Norman Conquest
At the time of the Norman conquest of England, the abbess was Æfgiva. King William the Conqueror confirmed Æfgiva's control of the abbey with a royal charter issued in either November or December 1066. William granted her "my peace and love, and all my rights within and without the burgh as fully as any abbess in that monastery of St.Mary had them in the time of King Edward". At the time, King William was staying at Barking Abbey whilst he constructed the Tower of London. It was also at the abbey that King William received the submissions of the brothers Morcar, Earl of Northumbria, and Edwin, Earl of Mercia; Morcar and Edwin's sister, Queen Ealdgyth was the widow of the defeated King Harold II (Godwinson).

Queen Maud/Matilda (c.1080–1 May 1118), wife of King Henry I, financed the construction of two stone bridges and a causeway over the branches of the River Lea in Stratford-by-Bow. As Barking Abbey was the closest to the bridges, the queen gave the abbey the responsibility for maintaining the bridges and donated lands as an endowment to finance those future repairs. After the foundation of Stratford Langthorne Abbey in 1135 (which was closer to the bridges), the Abbess of Barking transferred the responsibility to Stratford. This started a dispute between the two abbeys which was not settled until 1315. A settlement was reached when the Abbess of Barking paid the Abbot of Stratford Lanthorne £200; in return, the abbot agreed to maintain the bridges and causeway and to pay an annual rent of four marks to the abbess.

Mary Becket, the sister of Saint Thomas Becket, Archbishop of Canterbury, was created abbess of Barking in 1173, as reparation for the murder of her brother.

The abbey has been described as "perhaps the longest lived...institutional centre of literary culture for women in British history". During the twelfth century, Clemence of Barking, a nun at the abbey and a rare female author in this period, wrote, among other works, an innovative life of St Catherine of Alexandria, a saint associated with female learning.
 
Prior to 1214, as a "royal foundation", the abbesses of Barking had been chosen by the King. However, following pressure from the Pope, King John allowed the nuns to conduct elections to choose their abbess. The crown would later, however, claim they had the right to select a nun to join the abbey each time a new monarch acceded to the throne. This privilege was used to nominate Alice de Belhus on the accession of King Edward II in 1307, Margaret Swinford (daughter of Katherine Swynford and later abbess) on the accession of King Richard II in 1377, Maud Kylet in 1404 (five years after the accession of King Henry IV), and Goda Hapton in 1430 (eight years after the accession of King Henry VI).
 
The abbey's status granted it several rights and responsibilities. The abbess had precedence over all the other abbesses in England. She was also one of four abbesses who, "holding of the king by barony" were required to perform military service. The abbess had to perform these duties during the reigns of both King Henry III and King Edward I.

In the Taxation Rolls of 1291, the abbey was recorded as having an income of £300 13s 1¼d.

Elizabeth de Burgh Queen of Scots, captured by English in 1306, was confined here from March 1313 to March 1314.

Elizabeth de Clare was briefly imprisoned in Barking Abbey in 1322, as part of a campaign to force her to surrender some of her Welsh estates to Hugh Despenser the younger. Whilst imprisoned some of her "valuable possessions" were extorted but they were later recovered.

In 1377 a larger portion of the abbey's lands near to the River Thames was flooded. The devastation was severe and the abbey's fortunes never completely recovered: The devastation of the land, and the high cost of repairing dykes led to the abbey's impoverishment.

In 1382 the abbey's lands were recorded as still "inundated" (flooded), and their yearly income had fallen to 400 marks. In 1409, 32 years after the flood, the land had still not been reclaimed, despite the abbey having spent over £2,000 (equivalent to £ million in ) in attempts to save it. Around 720 acres of land had been lost; 600 of which was in Dagenham Marsh. Various attempts were made to try to help the abbey. In 1380 the king released the abbey from certain charges. In 1384 they were given permission to "impress" (force) labourers to help improve the situation on Dagenham Marsh. The abbey was granted "various liberties in Becontree hundred" in 1392 and 1462, and exempted from payment of "tenths" for ten years from 1409. It seems the land was never reclaimed, as during the reign of King Henry VII (1485–1509) the flooded lands were "exempted from the statute", thus "extending the jurisdiction of the Mayor of London as the conservator of the Thames".

In 1381 Elizabeth Chaucer became a nun at the abbey. Elizabeth was the daughter of the poet Geoffrey Chaucer and Philippa De Roet. When Elizabeth joined the abbey John of Gaunt paid £51 8s 2d "for expenses and gifts" for the occasion. Geoffery Chaucer was in the service of the king's court and John of Gaunt much of his life. Katherine Swynford, who eventually became the wife of John of Gaunt, was Philippa Chaucer's sister. Elizabeth Chaucer's brother, Thomas Chaucer, served in John of Gaunt's home at an early age and rose through the ranks to become very successful. Thomas's daughter would go on to become Duchess of Suffolk.

During Katherine de la Pole's time as abbess, the young Edmund and Jasper Tudor were sent to be brought up in the abbess's custody by King Henry VI's council. The boys were Henry VI's half brothers: the children of Owen Tudor and Catherine of Valois; herself the widow of King Henry V and Henry VI's mother. The Tudors were raised and educated at Barking under the care of Abbess Katherine. An allowance of £52 12s was paid for their maintenance. Edmund went on to father King Henry VII, who seized the throne at the Battle of Bosworth in 1485. 

The abbey's water supply was ransomed by John Rigby of Cranbrook Manor in 1462. The water conduit to the abbey had broken and John Rigby had it repaired. He then decided that the abbey should pay an annual fee for its water supply. Katherine de la Pole was annoyed at this and instigated work to find an alternative and independent supply from their own spring.

The Valor Ecclesiasticus of 1535 records the abbey's gross income as £1,084 6s 2¼d, which made it the third wealthiest nunnery in England; behind Sion Abbey and Shaftesbury Abbey.

Dissolution
The abbey was dissolved in 1539 as part of King Henry VIII's Dissolution of the Monasteries. It was formally surrendered by the abbess, and the 30 nuns, in the abbey's chapter-house on 14 November 1539. The abbess and nuns were all granted annual pensions 12 days later. The abbess' was 200 marks a year. Many of these pensions were still being paid during the reign of Queen Mary I.

After the dissolution, the abbey was demolished and much of its wealth was sold off. At the time of the dissolution the abbey also controlled the manors of Barking, Abbes Hall, Bulphan, Caldecotes in Abbess Roding, Cokermouth in Dagenham, Down Hall, Great Warley, Hanley Hall, Hawkesbury in Fobbing, Highall in Tollesbury, Hockley, Ingatestone, Leaden Roding Mucking, Tollesbury, Wangey Hall, Westbury in Barking, Wigborough and Wood Barns; all in Essex. Demolition started in June 1540 and took around 18 months to complete, with only the abbey's north gate and Curfew Tower were left standing. Records from 1540 show £744 was raised from selling the abbey's lead; £122 13s from the sale of the abbey's eleven bells (12,912 lb of "bellmetal"); and £182 2s 10d from the sale of "goods, grain and cattle". The abbey was also in possession of various jewels and valuables; including 3,586 ounces of silver.

Following its demolition some of the abbey's building materials were reused: some of the lead was used to repair Greenwich Palace's roof, and some of the stone used to construct King Henry VIII's new Manor at Dartford.

Remains (and present day)

In 1551 King Edward VI granted the abbey site and demesne land to Edward Clinton, 9th Baron Clinton (later 1st Earl of Lincoln). After that, the site was used as a quarry and a farm. The remains survived the Middle Ages, however, the North Gate was demolished around 1885. Today, only the Curfew Tower and the abbey's footprints and footings remain.

The majority of the remains are buried: those remains visible were built in the 20th century to show the abbey's layout, although the original walls of the abbey church stand several feet high in portions. A modern ward of the present borough is named Abbey after the ruin. The ruins sit within a public open space known as Abbey Green.

Curfew Tower

The Curfew Tower, also known as the Fire Bell Gate, was one of the abbey's three gateways and is the only part of the abbey not in ruins. The original tower was built in 1370, however the current tower was built around 1460. Above the gateway is "The Chapel of the Holy Rood", named for the 12th-century stone rood displayed within it.

The building has been repaired several times. In 1955/56 the chapel was redecorated and the windows repaired. In 2005/06 the tower was extensively repaired at the cost of £130,000. The staircase roof, and the covering of the main roof were replaced, and the tower's masonry was re-pointed, with the irreparably damaged stone replaced. Inside the chapel was again redecorated.

The tower is Grade-II* Listed, and is featured on the coat of arms of the London Borough of Barking and Dagenham.

London Bridge stones 
In 2007, two small stones from remains of the old medieval London Bridge were joined together in a sculpture in front of St Margaret's church facing the Barking Abbey ruins as part of several public artworks placed in Barking Town Centre by artist Joost Van Santen.

Burials
Æthelburh of Barking
Hildelith
Torchtgyd
Wulfhilda of Barking

List of abbesses
Abbesses of Barking Abbey:

 St. Ethelburga, c. 666 – c. 695, founder and first abbess of the Abbey
 St. Hildelitha (Hildelith), c. 695 – c. 700
 St. Wlfhildis (Wulfhilda), c. 965, created abbess by King Edgar the Peaceful, deposed by his wife Queen Elfrida who was jealous as the King was in love with her
 Queen Alftrudis. (Queen Elfrida?)
 St. Wlfhildis (Wulfhilda), again, died c. 990. Restored as abbess by King Æthelred the Unready
 Ælfgiva, c. 1066
 Matilda of Scotland, wife of King Henry I
 Agnes, appointed by King Henry I
 Matilda of Boulogne, wife of King Stephen
 Adeliza, sister of Payn FitzJohn, appointed by King Stephen
 Mary, sister of Thomas Becket, appointed 1173, created abbess in reparation for the murder of her brother
 Matilda of England, daughter of King Henry II, appointed c. 1175, occurs 1198
 Christiana de Valoniis, occurs 1202 and 1205
 Sybil, elected 1215
 Mabel de Boseham, 1215–1247, died in office
 Maud, illegitimate daughter of King John, 1247–1252, died in office
 Christiana de Boseham, 1252–1258, resigned
 Maud de Leveland, elected 1258–1275, resigned
 Alice de Merton, 1276–1291, died in office
 Isabel de Basinges, 1291–1294, died in office
 Maud de Grey, 1294–1295, died in office
 Anne de Vere. 1318, died in office
 Eleanor de Weston, 1318–1329, died in office
 Yolande de Sutton, 1329–1341, died in office
 Maud Montagu, 1341–1352, died in office
 Isabel Montagu, 1352–1358, died in office
 Katharine de Sutton, 1358–1377, died in office
 Maud Montagu, 1377–1393
 Sybil de Felton (or Morley), daughter of Sir Thomas and Dame Joan de Felton, 1393–1419, died in office
 Margaret Swynford, daughter of Katherine Swynford (wife of John of Gaunt, 1st Duke of Lancaster), 1419–1433, died in office
 Katherine de la Pole, daughter of Michael de la Pole, 2nd Earl of Suffolk, 1433–1473, died in office
 Elizabeth Lexham, 1473–1479, died in office
 Elizabeth Shuldham, 1479–1499, died in office
 Elizabeth Grene, 1499–1527, died in office
 Dorothy Barley, sister of Henry Barley, 1527–1539, the last abbess

Gallery

See also
 Barking Abbey School

References

External links

 Drawing of what Barking Abbey may have looked like
 Barking and Dagenham London Borough Council
 Tudor Place – Barking Abbey
 Houses of Benedictine nuns: Abbey of Barking, A History of the County of Essex: Volume 2 (1907), pp. 115–122

Christian monasteries established in the 7th century
Monasteries dissolved under the English Reformation
Parks and open spaces in the London Borough of Barking and Dagenham
History of the London Borough of Barking and Dagenham
Anglo-Saxon monastic houses
Monasteries in London
Benedictine monasteries in England
Ruins in London
Benedictine nunneries in England
Grade II* listed buildings in the London Borough of Barking and Dagenham
7th-century establishments in England
1541 disestablishments in England
Ruined abbeys and monasteries
Abbey
Double monasteries
Grade II* listed monasteries
Churches completed in 666
7th-century church buildings in England